Samuel Harrison House is a historic house at 82 Third Street in Pittsfield, Massachusetts. Built about 1850, it was for many years home to Rev. Samuel Harrison, a regionally-prominent African-American minister (1818–1900) who served as chaplain to the 54th Massachusetts Infantry Regiment during the American Civil War. It was listed on the National Register of Historic Places in 2006.

House
The Samuel Harrison House stands on the east side of Third Street near its junction with Silver Street in a residential area northeast of Pittsfield's central Park Square. It is a -story plank-framed wooden structure, with a gabled roof, and a shed-roof porch extending along its south side. It has modest vernacular Greek Revival elements, include gable returns and a Doric column supporting the porch, whose rear section is enclosed.

In 2004, the Samuel Harrison Society was formed to save Rev. Samuel Harrison's house from demolition after learning that it had historic value. Now with Rev. Harrison's house on the Registry of Historic Places, the Samuel Harrison Society is committed to restoring and preserving the home.

See also
National Register of Historic Places listings in Berkshire County, Massachusetts

References

External links
Samuel Harrison Society web site

Houses in Berkshire County, Massachusetts
Buildings and structures in Pittsfield, Massachusetts
Houses on the National Register of Historic Places in Berkshire County, Massachusetts
Greek Revival architecture in Massachusetts
African-American history of Massachusetts